The 2014 Caribbean Cup qualification began in May 2014 and ended in October 2014. The qualification competition determined which national teams could play in the 2014 Caribbean Cup which in turn determined which teams participated in the 2015 CONCACAF Gold Cup and the 2016 Copa América Centenario.

In March 2014, it was announced that Jamaica would host the 'final stage' of the competition in Montego Bay.

In April 2014, the Caribbean Football Union announced the group stage draw.

Participants
A total of 26 teams entered the competition.

Preliminary round
Group winners advanced to the first round.

Group 1
Hosted in Montserrat (UTC−4). On 8 May 2014, it was announced that Montserrat's Blakes Estate Stadium would be undergoing an inspection to host the group, previously it was announced that the host nation for Group 1 would be Bonaire. It is the first time Montserrat has been chosen to host any part of a Caribbean Football Union organised competition.

Group 2
Hosted in Aruba (UTC−4).

First round
Group winners, runners-up, and the best third-placed team advanced to the second round.

Group 3
Hosted in Martinique (UTC−4).

Group 4
Hosted in Puerto Rico (UTC−4).

Group 5
Hosted in Antigua and Barbuda (UTC−4).

Group 6
Hosted in Saint Kitts and Nevis (UTC−4).

Ranking of third place teams

Second round
Group winners and runners-up advanced to the final round.

Group 7
Hosted in Trinidad and Tobago (UTC−4).

Group 8
Hosted in Haiti (UTC−4).

Group 9
Hosted in Guadeloupe (UTC−4).

Goalscorers
8 goals
 Gabriel Pigrée

5 goals

 Julien Faubert
 Oalex Anderson

4 goals

 Jonathan Faña
 Gaël Germany
 Kevin Molino

3 goals

 Keiran Murtagh
 Dwayn Raven
 Mario Harte
 Yurick Seinpaal
 Kerbi Rodríguez
 Fabrice Awong
 José-Thierry Goron
 Kenwyne Jones

2 goals

 Peter Byers
 Nathaniel Jarvis
 Carl Joseph
 Arantees Lawrence
 Papito Merencia
 Prince Rajcomar
 Rony Beard
 Domingo Peralta
 Mickaël Solvi
 Terry James
 Jean Sony Alcénat
 Kervens Belfort
 Sébastien Crétinoir
 Joseph Marrero
 Héctor Ramos
 Atiba Harris
 Zephaniah Thomas
 Zaccheus Polius
 Cliff Valcin
 Myron Samuel
 Cornelius Stewart
 Miquel Cronie

1 goal

 Quinton Griffith
 Tevaughn Harriette
 Calaum Jahraldo-Martin
 Josh Parker
 Akeem Thomas
 Rensy Barradas
 Jelano Cruden
 Annuar Kock
 Emile Linkers
 Erik Santos de Gouveia
 Emmerson Boyce
 Romelle Burgess
 Romario Harewood
 Ricardo Morris
 Suehendley Barzey
 Jozef Beaumont
 Lacey Pauletta
 Shelton Martis
 Gevaro Nepomuceno
 Julian Wade
 Inoel Navarro
 Samuel Zayas
 Sergilio Atooman
 Sylvio Breleur
 Gilles Fabien
 David Martinon
 Orphéo Nalie
 Gary Pigrée
 Anthony Soubervie
 Kithson Bain
 Wendell Rennie
 Thomas Gamiette
 Ludovic Gotin
 Loïc Nestor
 Rudy Vouteau
 Wilde-Donald Guerrier
 Jean-David Legrand
 Jeff Louis
 Mathias Coureur
 Jaylee Hodgson
 Alex Oikkonen
 Devaughn Elliott
 Tishan Hanley
 Joash Leader
 Orlando Mitchum
 Harry Panayiotou
 Romaine Sawyers
 Sheldon Emmanuel
 Kurt Frederick
 Tremain Paul
 Nazir McBurnette
 Azinho Solomon
 Jerny Faerber
 Trevin Caesar
 Ataullah Guerra
 Stevens Derilien
 Marc Fenelus
 MacDonald Taylor, Jr.

Own goals

 Kyle Kentish (playing against Dominican Republic)
 Karanja Mack (playing against Dominican Republic)
 Emmerson Boyce (playing against Martinique)
 Kervin Lawrence (playing against Saint Kitts and Nevis)
 Frantz Bertin (playing against Barbados)
 Kely Louima (playing against French Guiana)

References

External links
Caribbean Cup, CFUfootball.org
First round results
Second round results

Qualification
Carib
Caribbean Cup qualification